maXair is a Huss Park Attractions Giant Frisbee ride at Cedar Point in Sandusky, Ohio, United States. It is one of two HUSS Giant Frisbees in the United States, the other being Delirium at Kings Island. It is located near the front of the park near Troika, GateKeeper, and Kiddy Kingdom.

Ride experience
At the start of the cycle, a movable floor drops to allow clearance for the ride to move. After that, the ride begins to swing back and forth as the circular gondola rotates, gaining more height and speed with each swing. The pendulum motion propels riders back and forth at  up to an arc of 120 degrees, making it one of the fastest non-coaster rides at Cedar Point. At the end of the cycle, the pendulum gradually slows to a stop and the gondola stops rotating. Once the pendulum and gondola are parked at the loading position, the floor rises and the restraints release.

maXair is one of several rides at Cedar Point that require glasses to be secured with an athletic strap. Loose articles may be brought into the queue, but must be secured in small cubbies located around the gondola on the loading platform.

Riders are secured with a ratcheting shoulder harness and a backup seatbelt between the legs. In addition to the seatbelt, the restraints contain sensors which will not allow the ride to be started unless all 50 harnesses have been closed past a certain limit, which is indicated by a green light near each seat.

See also
 Delirium at Kings Island, the only other HUSS Giant Frisbee in the United States.
 Titan at La Ronde, a similar ride produced by Zamperla.

References

External links

 Official maXair page
 Official POV of maXair
 maXair Photo Gallery at The Point Online
 Video of maXair in 2019

Amusement rides manufactured by HUSS Park Attractions
Amusement rides introduced in 2005
Pendulum rides
Cedar Point
Cedar Fair attractions